KJTV may refer to:

 KJTV-TV, a television station (channel 35, virtual 34) licensed to serve Lubbock, Texas, United States
 KJTV-CD, a low-power television station (channel 33, virtual 32) licensed to serve Lubbock-Wolfforth, Texas
 KJTV (AM), a radio station (950 AM) licensed to serve Lubbock, Texas
 KGET-TV, a television station (channel 17) licensed to serve Bakersfield, California, which used the call sign KJTV from 1969 to 1978.